Ben Gordon (born 1983) is a British-American former basketball player.

Ben Gordon may also refer to:

Ben Gordon (footballer, born 1985), Scottish footballer (Dumbarton, Alloa Athletic)
Ben Gordon (footballer, born 1991), English footballer (Chelsea, Kilmarnock, Ross County, Colchester United)
Ben Gordon (ice hockey) (born 1985), American ice hockey player
Benjamin Franklin Gordon (1826–1866), Confederate States Army colonel during the American Civil War

See also
Benny Gordon (disambiguation)
Gordon (disambiguation)